Ibrahim Gary (born 22 October 1985 in Argenteuil, France)  is a French karateka who won a silver medal at the 2008 World Karate Championships in the men's kumite +80 kg weight class.

References

French male karateka
1985 births
Sportspeople from Argenteuil
Living people
20th-century French people
21st-century French people